David IX of Georgia (died 1360), from the Bagrationi dynasty, was king of Georgia from 1346 until his death.

Family
David was the only known son of George V of Georgia. The identity of his mother is not known. The "Georgian Chronicle" of the 18th century reports George V marrying a daughter of "the Greek Emperor, Lord Michael Komnenos". However the reigning dynasty of the Byzantine Empire in the 14th century were the Palaiologoi, not the Komnenoi. The marriage of a daughter of Michael IX Palaiologos and his wife Rita of Armenia to a Georgian ruler is not recorded in Byzantine sources. Neither is the existence of any illegitimate daughters of Michael IX. The Komnenoi did rule however in the Empire of Trebizond. A Michael Komnenos was Emperor from 1344 to 1349. His wife was Acropolitissa. Their only child recorded in primary sources was John III of Trebizond. Whether John III had siblings is unknown.

Reign
He ascended the throne succeeding on the death of his father George V the Brilliant in 1346. However, the kingdom’s stability and prosperity left by his father was not to last, as the Black Death swept through the area in 1348, decimating the population and producing a severe economic crisis.

He died, to be succeeded by his son, Bagrat V the Great in 1360.

He was married to Sindukhtar, daughter of Ioann I Jaqeli, Prince of Samtskhe-Saatabago. They had two children:

Bagrat V of Georgia
Gulkhan-Eudokia of Georgia (d. 1395), who was betrothed first to Andronicus Comnenus and after he died his paternal half-brother, Emperor Manuel III of Trebizond, whom she married in 1379. Both were sons of Alexios III of Trebizond, the first was an illegitimate and the second a legitimate son by Empress Theodora Kantakouzene.

References

External links

Bagrationi dynasty of the Kingdom of Georgia
Kings of Georgia
1360 deaths
Eastern Orthodox monarchs
Year of birth unknown